Rosa 'Perfume Delight' is a pink hybrid tea rose rose cultivar, bred by Herbert Swim and Weeks Rose Growers in 1973. The rose was named an All-America Rose Selections winner in 1974.

Description
'Perfume Delight' is a bushy upright shrub, up to 4 ft (121 cm) in height with  a  3 ft (91 cm)  spread. Petals are typically 4-5 inches, with a high-centered, cupped form. Flowers open a dark pink and fade to pale pink. Blooms are rain resistant and have a strong, sweet fragrance. 'Perfume Delight' is a disease resistant plant, with large, glossy, leathery foliage. It thrives in USDA zone, 6 and warmer. The plant is almost continuously in bloom from spring through fall.

Awards
 All-America Rose Selections winner, USA, (1969)

See also
Garden roses
Rose Hall of Fame
List of Award of Garden Merit roses

References

Perfume Delight